The term olive loaf can refer to two different food products. 

It can be a type of meatloaf or cold cut embedded with pimento-stuffed green olives.

The other food is also known as olive bread, a bread laced with whole olives.

See also
 List of breads

References

Lunch meat
Breads
Olive dishes